Lesce may refer to:
 Lesce, a town in Upper Carniola, Slovenia
 Leśce, a village in Lublin Voivodeship, Poland
 Lešće, a neighborhood of Belgrade, Serbia
 Ličko Lešće, a village in Croatia
 Malo Lešče, a settlement in White Carniola, Slovenia

See also